is Beni's twelfth single under the label Nayutawave Records. "Koe wo Kikasete" is an unrequited love song that describes the feeling of a woman who is asking the one she loves: "who are you thinking about?". The other A-side is named "Crazy Girl" is an upbeat song that is meant to dance to.

Track list

References

2011 singles
Beni (singer) songs